The 2018–19 Austrian Football Second League  is the 45th season of the Austrian second-level football league and the first one as the Second League. The league has been expanded to 16 teams for this season with one team being promoted to the Austrian Bundesliga and 3 teams being relegated to the Austrian Regionalliga at the end of the season.

Teams
Sixteen teams will participate in the 2018–19 season. SV Horn, SKU Amstetten, FK Austria Wien II, SV Lafnitz, SK Vorwärts Steyr, FC Juniors OÖ, SK Austria Klagenfurt and FC Wacker Innsbruck II were promoted either through promotion or application to the new league structure. No team was relegated the previous season due to a decision made in the expansion of the league.

Personnel and kits

League table

Results

Season statistics

Top goalscorers

Top assists

Discipline

See also
 2018–19 Austrian Football Bundesliga
 2018–19 Austrian Cup

References

External links
 Official website 

2. Liga (Austria) seasons
2018–19 in Austrian football
Aus